The  is a mid-size car manufactured by Toyota between 2004 and 2019, and was primarily aimed at the Japanese market. In Japan, it was the top-level car, sold only new at Toyopet Store locations. The Mark X was introduced in 2004 and is the successor to the Mark II which was first introduced in 1968, and was known in the North American market as the Corona Mark II starting in 1972, and renamed the Cressida from 1977 to 1992.

The "Mark X" is not pronounced "Mark Ten" but "Mark Ex", though the "Mark II" is "Mark Two". The Mark X is a continuation of the previous Mark II and its siblings, the sport-oriented Chaser, and the luxurious Cresta in one vehicle, repeating an approach previously attempted by the short-lived Verossa that used inline-six engines, whereas the Mark X uses V6 engines.

The Mark X was previously sold as an alternative to the front-wheel drive Camry, which was once the largest new saloon at Corolla Store locations, for buyers who like the size of the Camry, but prefer a rear-wheel drive layout.

Different engine sizes were offered to allow Japanese buyers which annual road tax they were willing to pay; the larger engines offer higher levels of standard equipment and luxury features. Both the first and second generation Mark X were manufactured at the Motomachi plant in Japan.

The Mark X was sold as the Reiz in China, which was produced by Tianjin FAW Toyota Motor Co. Ltd. It was produced until 2017. The Mark X was also officially imported to Indonesia in limited quantities between 2012 and 2013, to replace Australian-built Camrys as premium taxis.



First generation (X120; 2004) 

Toyota unveiled the Mark X saloon in 2004 as the successor to the Mark II saloon which has been on the market since 1968. Instead of being based on a modified Supra chassis "A" series platform, the Mark X continues to use the Toyota "X" platform, and does not share its platform with the Toyota "S" series platform used under the Crown and Lexus GS. The continuation of describing this vehicle as the "X" series is a reference to the first dedicated Mark II platform introduced in 1972. Major changes to the Mark series are the engine and footwork. Toyota discontinued the inline-six engines used in the Verossa which included the JZ series and the G series engines, and went to the newly developed GR series engine. Either the  2.5 L (2,497 cc) 4GR-FSE or the  3.0 L (2,995 cc) 3GR-FSE engine options were available.

Both engines offer Dual VVT-i with D-4 direct injection. The rear-wheel drive models have a 6-speed torque converter automatic transmission as standard and the four-wheel drive models have a 5-speed automatic. No manual transmission options were offered.

A first in its class is the rear bumper with an integrated exhaust outlet, which later made its way on to the corresponding model year Lexus LS series and the Crown. An LED lamp for the ceiling runs from the front of the vehicle to the rear, creating a "mood" lighting system. The LED system is also incorporated into the gear shifter and key area of the vehicle.

Minor changes were made in 2006. Mirror-mounted indicators replaced the fender-mounted units, taillamps were revised and the grille was redesigned. Mark X with all black interior colour deleted the wood trim in favour of the brushed aluminium trim. This change also gives the formal introduction of the "S package" which gain the three-spoke steering wheel and changes to the exterior lip piece.

In 2007 for Japanese models only, G-BOOK, a subscription telematics service, is offered as an option.

The former Kanto Auto Works produced the Mark X from November 2004 to September 2006.

China 
The Chinese market Reiz is sold in 2.5 S, 2.5 V and 3.0 V Premium trim levels with 2.5 L (2,497 cc) 5GR-FE and 3.0 L (2,995 cc) 3GR-FE engines.

Special versions

Mark X Supercharged 
The Mark X Supercharged version uses the supercharged 3GR-FSE engine paired to 6-speed automatic transmission.

50th Anniversary Limited Edition 
A limited edition 50th Anniversary Limited Edition Mark X was produced with the Vertiga kit. It has chrome ducts and carbon fibre splitters as standard parts, as well as different suspension tuning.

Second generation (X130; 2009) 

The second generation Mark X was released on 19 October 2009, followed by the Reiz in September 2010. Engine options are the  2.5 L (2,497 cc) 4GR-FSE V6 and the  3.5 L (3,456 cc) 2GR-FSE V6. Models available are Standard, Premium and Sports. Changes from the previous generation include the elimination of the exhaust outlet diffuser, 6-speed automatic transmission for 4WD models and return to the hinge design trunk instead of lift support.

The Mark X received two facelifts in 2012 and 2016. The 2016 facelift received additional spot welding to strengthen the body. The vehicles also gained "Toyota Safety Sense" consisting of autonomous emergency braking, lane departure alert, automatic high beams and radar cruise control as standard.

Models

Standard 
The Standard model is the entry-level variant. Available only with the 2.5 L engine, it is available in rear-wheel drive (250G, 250G "F package" and Relax Selection) and four-wheel drive (250G Four, 250G "F package") option. It has an ivory and black interior colour and the option of wood-grain panel colour.

Premium 
This variant is available with the 2.5 L or 3.5 L engine. The exterior differentiates itself from other grades by arranging the mall plated grille, trim specific side skirts and unique front bumper design. It also features a millimetre-wave radar system for cruise control and a pre-crash safety system with brake activation. The seat upholstery is made from Alcantara (with leather being an option). Super UV cut glass and nanoE air ventilation system is also used on this grade. Other features include a retractable rear sunshade, fully automatic self-parking system, driver's power 8-way adjustable seat and passenger 4-way power seat (with inbuilt heating and cooling) and electronically adjustable shock absorbers (Adaptive Variable Suspension System (AVS) which can be controlled from the cabin.

Sports 
The Sports variant is available as the 250S/250RDS and the 350S/350RDS. It is designed to replace the Tourer V variant from previous models of the X-chassis cars. Standard on the exterior is a rear trunk spoiler, rear diffuser and a redesigned front and rear bumper dedicated to improving aerodynamic performance. In addition, it has a smoked coating on the headlamps and taillamps to differentiate itself from the other models. Specific to the 350S is special 18x8J aluminium wheels with 235/45R18 tyres,  large-diameter ventilated front brake disks and four-piston "aluminium monobloc callipers" made by ADVICS Co. Unique to the Sports variant is Vehicle Dynamics Integrated Management with variable gear ratio steering which changes the ratio of steering input to wheel movement so as to help low-speed parking as well as remain stable at high speed. Also standard on the 350S is the AVS. This is backed up with other safety features such as VSC, traction control, ABS and EBD. Other standard features include aluminium pedals, footrest and steering wheel paddle shifters. Auto tilt-away steering wheel (when the ignition is switched off) is standard on the 3.5 L models only. Driver's power 8-way adjustable seat and passenger 4-way power seat, seat heating and cooling, and leather interior are available as options.

Special versions

Sports Plus 
The Sports Plus is a version of the Mark X Sports with a 2.5 L engine, sold in Hong Kong and Macau. It includes front and rear spoilers, front fog lamps, gear shift paddles, electronically controlled suspension, leather seat and front seat heater.

Mark X +M Super Charger/Vertiga 
As with the previous generation Mark X, Toyota's in-house tuning company Modellista installed a supercharger on the 3.5 L 2GR-FSE engine and marketed as Mark X +M Super Charger. Modellista also produced a non-supercharged version of the Mark X called Vertiga.

G's/GR Sport 

The G's (renamed to GR Sport in 2016) variant is based on 250S or 350S models. The G's/GR Sport Mark X is very noticeably distinct with a 3-piece bodykit, rear trunk spoiler, clear smoked taillamps, forged aluminium 19x8J wheels, four-piston calipers with  front and  rear ventilated brake disks, upgraded suspension, red stitching leather interior, carbon style centre console and instrument panel, upgraded Alcantara front seats, etc.

GRMN 
The Mark X GRMN (Gazoo Racing, tuned by the Meister of the Nürburgring) is a limited-production variant (100 units in 2015, 350 units in 2019) based on the 3.5 L model.

Discontinuation 
On 27 September 2017, Toyota ended production of the Reiz in China with a total of 528,188 units produced since 2004.

Production of the Mark X ended on 23 December 2019 in Japan with a total of 6.9 million units (including the Mark II) produced since the first production of Corona Mark II began 51 years earlier. Before the discontinuation, Toyota released the limited-production Mark X 250S Final Edition. The Final Edition comes equipped with 18-inch aluminium wheels, dark chrome-plated front bumper trim, and a red and black interior finished in Alcantara and leather. This marked the end of the Mark II lineage that was introduced in 1968.

Mark X ZiO 

The Mark X ZiO MPV shares only a name with the Mark X saloon and is based on the smaller front-wheel drive New MC platform.

References 

Mark X
Cars introduced in 2004
2010s cars
Mid-size cars
Sedans
Rear-wheel-drive vehicles
All-wheel-drive vehicles